100 Squadron may refer to:
 100 Squadron (Israel), an Israeli Air Force unit
 No. 100 Squadron RAF (100 Sqn), a Royal Air Force unit
 No. 100 Squadron RAAF, a Royal Australian Air Force unit